Separate Ways is a compilation album issued by RCA Records on December 1, 1972 from American singer and musician Elvis Presley. Released on the budget RCA Camden label shortly after another similar compilation, Burning Love and Hits from His Movies, Volume 2, Separate Ways was the second and final attempt by RCA to repackage older Elvis recordings by pairing them with a recent chart hit, in this case "Separate Ways" and its flipside "Always On My Mind".

Separate Ways peaked on the Billboard chart at number 46 and the Country Album chart at number 12 on its release and has since gone on to sell over 3 million copies worldwide. It was certified gold on March 27, 1992, and platinum on January 6, 2004, by the RIAA.

Content
Next to "Separate Ways" and "Always On My Mind" the remainder of the album — which was not promoted as a compilation on the front cover — consisted of previously released recordings from 1960s Presley film soundtracks, plus one song, "Old Shep", originally issued on Elvis' second album, released in 1956. In the mid 1970s, The Pickwick Records reissue label leased the rights to reissue several albums from the RCA catalog. Separate Ways appeared on the Pickwick label utilizing the original RCA Camden catalog number, CAS-2611. The album contents and cover art are the same as the original RCA issue. After Presley's death in 1977, RCA sought to reclaim the rights to their Pickwick/Camden recordings.
In 1991, Separate Ways was reissued for the first time on compact disc in Canada on the RCA Camden label. RCA reissued the album on CD again in 2006 as part of a reissue series featuring most of Presley's RCA Camden albums.

Title track
Presley recorded "Separate Ways", written by Red West and Richard Mainegra, on March 27, 1972, and the country song "Always On My Mind" on March 29. They were released together as a single on October 31, 1972. It reached gold status in the US for sales of over half a million copies. It was listed as a double-sided hit reaching #16 on Billboard's Hot Country Singles chart in November 1972. In the UK "Always On My Mind" was the hit song and "Separate Ways" was the B-side.

Track listing

References

External links

1973 compilation albums
Elvis Presley compilation albums
RCA Records compilation albums